GBA-19 (Ghizer-I) is a constituency of Gilgit Baltistan Assembly which is currently represented by Nawaz Khan Naji of BNF.

Members

Election results

2009
Nawaz Khan Naji of BNF became member of assembly in 2009 elections.

2015
Nawaz Khan Naji of BNF politician won this seat again by getting 5,259 votes.

References

Gilgit-Baltistan Legislative Assembly constituencies